Minipops is a television series broadcast in 1983 on Channel 4 in the United Kingdom. Designed primarily for younger viewers, it consisted of music performances on a brightly coloured set featuring preteen children singing then-contemporary pop music hits and older classics. The children were usually made to look like the original performers, including clothing and make-up. Controversy over children singing songs that often contained a subtext of adult content (in adult costumes and make-up) led to the show's cancellation after one series.

History
Minipops was the brainchild of Martin Wyatt, who created a new child group from London called the MiniPops and released an album in 1982 which reached the top 30 in the UK and Europe. This resulted in a French record label releasing a single from the album, "Stupid Cupid",  which was sung by Martin Wyatt's young daughter Jo. The song reached number 1 in France, knocking "Ebony and Ivory" off the top spot.

Head of Entertainment Cecil Korer at Channel 4 and record producer Mike Mansfield embraced the idea of producing a TV show around the MiniPops; Korer believed it would boost and broaden the group's audience appeal. On 4 July 1982, thousands of amateur child performers from across Britain descended on a London theatre for the audition in a search to find additional children to sing and star in the television show with the original five members of the group.

Criticism
Though the series was a success for Channel 4 (gaining 2,000,000 viewers), little thought was given to the ethics of child performers singing songs originally written for older artists and dressing and dancing in a provocative style (often influenced by the original performance).
Whilst embraced by children who loved the idea of ordinary children singing and dancing (as they did) along with their favourite songs, the show sat uneasily with some adults; this was capped by a performance from seven-year-old Joanna Fisher, who covered the Sheena Easton song "9 to 5" in nightclothes and included the lyrics "night time is the right time, we make love".

In response, the programme began attracting criticism from commentators in the British media who suggested that portraying children in this manner (singing songs which often contained a subtext of adult content, often in unsuitable costumes and heavy make-up) was somewhat sinister (one caller on Channel 4's Right to Reply programme fumed, "Minipops should be called MiniWhores. Are you people out of your mind?"). Minipops was criticised in a 27 February 1983 article in The Observer:

"Is it merely priggish to feel queasy at the sight of primary school minxes with rouged cheeks, eye make-up and full-gloss lipstick belting out songs like torch singers and waggling those places where they will eventually have places?  The final act of last week's show featured a chubby blonde totlette, thigh-high to a paedophile, in a ra-ra skirt and high heels; her black knickers were extensively flashed as she bounced around singing the words 'See that guy all dressed in green/He's not a man, he's a loving machine.'  Kiddie porn, a shop-window full of junior jailbait?  And does the show thrust premature sexual awareness onto its wide-eyed performers?"

The child cast and the show's creators were somewhat shocked at the response, despite the ratings success. When Cecil Korer was replaced by Mike Bolland as head of entertainment for Channel 4, he cancelled plans for a second series.

Discography
Seven albums were produced and released in the UK, Europe and Canada.

Albums
Before the television show:
 The Mini Pops (1982)

After the television show:
 We're the Mini Pops (1983)
 Christmas (1984)
 Let's Dance (1984)
 Wanna Have Fun (1985)
 Magic Juke Box (1986)
 Rocket to the Stars

In Canada We're the Mini Pops was successful, becoming the third-highest-selling album in Canada at the time. This prompted the Minipops to hold a three-week tour in 1983, enjoying controversy-free success.

A number of singles were released across Europe.

Related TV shows
On 11 October 2005, Channel 4 screened a follow-up programme called Whatever Happened to the Minipops?. This featured a history of the show, interviews with the former Minipops and crew and a reunion at the original theatre where the programme was filmed.

The Day Today
In 1994 the BBC comedy The Day Today parodied the Minipops. The satirical news programme advertised a fictional Attitudes Night on BBC2, which looked back at past television shows to illustrate how attitudes had changed. One such example was the programme "Kiddystare, Channel Four, 1983" in which nude toddlers romped for the pleasure of adults.

See also
Kidz Bop
Mini Pop Kids

References

External links

Child musical groups
1983 British television series debuts
1983 British television series endings
Channel 4 original programming
1980s British music television series
Television controversies in the United Kingdom